The 114 Squadron of the Israeli Air Force, also known as the Night Leaders Squadron, is a helicopter squadron of CH-53-2000 Sea Stallions based at Tel Nof Airbase.

See also
Operation Rhodes

References

Israeli Air Force squadrons